Sutherland Falls is a waterfall near Milford Sound in New Zealand's South Island. At 580 metres (1,904 feet) the falls were long believed to be the tallest waterfall in New Zealand. Terror Falls, in the Poseidon Valley (nearby), are 750m, and Browne Falls cascades 843 metres (2,766 feet) down a mountainside in Doubtful Sound, leading some to view that as the tallest.

The water falls from Lake Quill in three cascades: the upper is 229 m tall, the middle is 248 m, and the lower is 103 m tall. A vertical fall of 580 m is made over 480 m of horizontal distance, thus the mean grade of falls is approximately 56 degrees.

The base of Sutherland Falls is a 90 minutes (return) walk from Quintin Public Shelter on the Milford Track.

Sutherland Falls are visible in the background of the eagle scene in Peter Jackson's fantasy film  The Hobbit.

History 
Sutherland Falls was first known to Europeans when a Scottish settler, Donald Sutherland, saw them in 1880.

Lake Quill, which forms the source of the falls, was named for the first European explorer who climbed up the cliff face to find it in 1890.

References

External links 

 World of Waterfalls: Sutherland Falls

Waterfalls of Fiordland
Tiered waterfalls